Men Behaving Badly is a British sitcom that was created and written by Simon Nye.  It was first broadcast on ITV from 1992, moving to BBC One from 1994 to 1998.  A total of six series were made along with a Christmas special and three final episodes that make up the feature-length "last orders".

Each episode follows the lives of flatmates Gary Strang (Martin Clunes) and Tony Smart (Neil Morrissey) - except series 1, in which Dermot Povey (Harry Enfield) is Gary's flatmate. The other major characters are Gary's girlfriend Dorothy Bishop (Caroline Quentin) and the occupant of the flat above, later Tony's girlfriend, Deborah Burton (Leslie Ash).

Series overview

Episode list

Series 1 (1992)

Series 2 (1992)

Series 3 (1994)

Series 4 (1995)

Series 5 (1996)

Series 6 (1997)

Christmas Special (1997)

Last Orders (1998)

Other media

Comic Relief Special (1997)

Comic Relief Special (1999)

Stand Up To Cancer & The Feeling Nuts Comedy Night Special (2014)

References

External links

BBC-related lists
Lists of British sitcom episodes